Mirtazapine, sold under the brand name Remeron amongst others, is an atypical tetracyclic antidepressant, and as such is used primarily to treat depression. Its effects may take up to four weeks, but can also manifest as early as one to two weeks. It is often used in cases of depression complicated by anxiety or insomnia. The effectiveness of mirtazapine is comparable to other commonly prescribed antidepressants. It is taken by mouth.

Common side effects include sleepiness, dizziness, increased appetite and weight gain. Serious side effects may include mania,  low white blood cell count, and increased suicide among children. Withdrawal symptoms may occur with stopping. It is not recommended together with a monoamine oxidase inhibitor, although evidence supporting the danger of this combination has been challenged. It is unclear if use during pregnancy is safe. How it works is not clear, but it may involve blocking certain adrenergic and serotonin receptors. Chemically, it is a tetracyclic antidepressant, and is closely related to mianserin. It also has strong antihistaminergic effects.

Mirtazapine came into medical use in the United States in 1996. The patent expired in 2004, and generic versions are available. In 2020, it was the 104th most commonly prescribed medication in the United States with more than 6million prescriptions.

Medical uses
Mirtazapine is approved by the United States Food and Drug Administration for the treatment of major depressive disorder in adults.

Depression
Mirtazapine is primarily used for major depressive disorder and other mood disorders. Onset of action appears faster than some selective serotonin reuptake inhibitors and similar to tricyclic antidepressants.

In 2010, the National Institute for Health and Care Excellence recommended generic selective serotonin reuptake inhibitors as first line choices, as they are "equally effective as other antidepressants and have a favourable risk–benefit ratio." With respect to mirtazapine, it found: "There is no difference between mirtazapine and other antidepressants on any efficacy measure, although in terms of achieving remission mirtazapine appears to have a statistical though not clinical advantage. In addition, mirtazapine has a statistical advantage over selective serotonin reuptake inhibitors in terms of reducing symptoms of depression, but the difference is not clinically significant. However, there is strong evidence that patients taking mirtazapine are less likely to leave treatment early because of side effects, although this is not the case for patients reporting side effects or leaving treatment early for any reason."

A 2011 Cochrane review that compared mirtazapine to other antidepressants found that, while it appears to have a faster onset in people for whom it works (measured at two weeks), its efficacy is about the same as other antidepressants after six weeks' use.

A 2012 review focused on antidepressants and sleep found that in many people with sleep disorders caused by depression, mirtazapine reduces the time it takes to fall asleep and increases the quality of sleep, but that in some people it can disturb sleep, especially at higher doses, causing restless leg syndrome in 8 to 28% of people and in rare cases causes REM sleep behavior disorder. This seemingly paradoxical dose–response curve of mirtazapine with respect to somnolence is owed to the exceptionally high affinity of the drug for the histamine H1, 5-HT2A, and 5-HT2C receptors; exhibiting near exclusive occupation of these receptors at doses ≤15 mg. However, at higher doses, inverse antagonism and constitutive activation of the  α2A-, α2B-, and α2C-adrenergic receptors begins to offset activity at H1 receptors leading to decreased somnolence and even a subjective sensation of "activation" in treated patients.

A 2018 analysis of 21 antidepressants found them to be fairly similar overall. It found tentative evidence for mirtazapine being in the more effective group and middle in tolerability.

After one week of usage, mirtazapine was found to have an earlier onset of action compared to selective serotonin reuptake inhibitors.

Other
There is also some evidence supporting its use in treating the following conditions, for which it is sometimes prescribed off-label:

 Generalized anxiety disorder
 Social anxiety disorder
 Obsessive–compulsive disorder
 Panic disorder
 Post-traumatic stress disorder
 Low appetite/underweight
 Insomnia
 Nausea and vomiting
 Itching
 Headaches and migraine

A major systematic review and network meta-analysis of medications for the treatment of insomnia published in 2022 found little evidence to inform the use of mirtazapine for insomnia.

Doses of mirtazapine used for sleep range from 7.5 to 45 mg. Doses of 7.5 to 15 mg are recommended as mirtazapine may become more stimulating at higher doses.

Side effects
A 2011 Cochrane review found that, compared with other antidepressants, it is more likely to cause weight gain and sleepiness, but it is less likely to cause tremor than tricyclic antidepressants, and less likely to cause nausea and sexual dysfunction than selective serotonin reuptake inhibitors.

Very common (≥10% incidence) adverse effects include constipation, dry mouth, sleepiness, increased appetite (17%) and weight gain (>7% increase in <50% of children).

Common (1–10% incidence) adverse effects include weakness, confusion, dizziness, fasciculations (muscle twitches), peripheral edema (swelling, usually of the lower limbs), and negative lab results like elevated transaminases, elevated serum triglycerides, and elevated total cholesterol.

Mirtazapine is not considered to have a risk of many of the side effects often associated with other antidepressants like the selective serotonin reuptake inhibitors, and may actually improve certain ones when taken in conjunction with them. (Those adverse effects include decreased appetite, weight loss, insomnia, nausea and vomiting, diarrhea, urinary retention, increased body temperature, excessive sweating, pupil dilation and sexual dysfunction.)

In general, some antidepressants, especially selective serotonin reuptake inhibitors, can paradoxically exacerbate some peoples' depression or anxiety or cause suicidal ideation. Despite its sedating action, mirtazapine is also believed to be capable of this, so in the United States and certain other countries, it carries a black box label warning of these potential effects, especially for people under the age of 25.

Mirtazapine may induce arthralgia (non-inflammatory joint pain)

A case report published in 2000 noted an instance in which mirtazapine counteracted the action of clonidine, causing a dangerous rise in blood pressure.

In a study comparing 32 antidepressants of all pharmacological classes, mirtazapine was one of the antidepressants most likely to cause nightmare disorder, sleepwalking, restless legs syndrome, night terrors and sleep paralysis.

Mirtazapine has been associated with an increased risk of death compared to other antidepressants in several studies. However, it is more likely that the residual differences between people prescribed mirtazapine rather than a selective serotonin reuptake inhibitor account for the difference in risk of mortality.

Withdrawal
Mirtazapine and other antidepressants may cause withdrawal symptoms upon cessation. A gradual and slow reduction in dose is recommended to minimize withdrawal symptoms. Effects of sudden cessation of treatment with mirtazapine may include depression, anxiety, tinnitus, panic attacks, vertigo, restlessness, irritability, decreased appetite, insomnia, diarrhea, nausea, vomiting, flu-like symptoms, allergy-like symptoms such as pruritus, headaches, and sometimes mania or hypomania.

Overdose
Mirtazapine is considered to be relatively safe in the event of an overdose, although it is considered slightly more toxic in overdose than most of the selective serotonin reuptake inhibitors (except citalopram). Unlike the tricyclic antidepressants, mirtazapine showed no significant cardiovascular adverse effects at 7 to 22 times the maximum recommended dose. 

Twelve reported fatalities have been attributed to mirtazapine overdose. The fatal toxicity index (deaths per million prescriptions) for mirtazapine is 3.1 (95% CI: 0.1 to 17.2). This is similar to that observed with selective serotonin reuptake inhibitors.

Interactions 

Concurrent use with inhibitors or inducers of the cytochrome P450 isoenzymes CYP1A2, CYP2D6, and/or CYP3A4 can result in altered concentrations of mirtazapine, as these are the main enzymes responsible for its metabolism. As examples, fluoxetine and paroxetine, inhibitors of these enzymes, are known to modestly increase mirtazapine levels, while carbamazepine, an inducer, considerably decreases them. Liver impairment and moderate chronic kidney disease have been reported to decrease the oral clearance of mirtazapine by about 30%; severe kidney disease decreases it by 50%.

Mirtazapine in combination with a selective serotonin reuptake inhibitor, serotonin–norepinephrine reuptake inhibitor, or tricyclic antidepressant as an augmentation strategy is considered to be relatively safe and is often employed therapeutically but caution should be given when combined with fluvoxamine. There is a combination of venlafaxine and mirtazapine, sometimes referred to as "California rocket fuel". Several case reports document serotonin syndrome induced by the combination of mirtazapine with other agents (olanzapine, quetiapine, tramadol and venlafaxine). Adding fluvoxamine to treatment with mirtazapine may cause a significant increase in mirtazapine concentration. This interaction may necessitate adjustment of the mirtazapine dosage.

According to information from the manufacturers, mirtazapine should not be started within two weeks of any monoamine oxidase inhibitor usage; likewise, monoamine oxidase inhibitors should not be administered within two weeks of discontinuing mirtazapine.

The addition of mirtazapine to a monoamine oxidase inhibitor, while potentially having typical or idiosyncratic (unique to the individual) reactions not herein described, does not appear to cause serotonin syndrome. This is in accordance with the fact that the 5-HT2A receptor is the predominant serotonin receptor thought to be involved in the pathophysiology of serotonin syndrome (with the 5-HT1A receptor seeming to be protective). Mirtazapine is a potent 5-HT2A receptor antagonist, and cyproheptadine, a medication that shares this property, mediates recovery from serotonin syndrome and is an antidote against it.

There is a possible interaction that results in a hypertensive crisis when mirtazapine is given to a patient that has already been on steady doses of clonidine.  This involves a subtle consideration, when patients have been on chronic therapy with clonidine and suddenly stop the dosing, a rapid hypertensive rebound sometimes (20%) occurs from increased sympathetic outflow. Clonidine's blood pressure lowering effects are due to stimulation of presynaptic α2 autoreceptors in the CNS which suppress sympathetic outflow. Mirtazapine itself blocks these same α2 autoreceptors, so the effect of adding mirtazapine to a patient stabilized on clonidine may precipitate withdrawal symptoms.

Pharmacology

Pharmacodynamics

Mirtazapine is sometimes described as a noradrenergic and specific serotonergic antidepressant (NaSSA), although the actual evidence in support of this label has been regarded as poor. It is a tetracyclic piperazine-azepine.

Mirtazapine is a potent antagonist of 5-HT2a and 5-HT3 receptors. Mirtazapine has no significant affinity for the 5-HT1A and 5-HT1B receptors. Mirtazapine is a potent antagonist of histamine H1 receptors, a property that may explain its prominent sedative effects.

Mirtazapine has antihistamine, α2-blocker, and antiserotonergic activity. It is specifically a potent antagonist or inverse agonist of the α2A-, α2B-, and α2C-adrenergic receptors, the serotonin 5-HT2A, 5-HT2C, and the histamine H1 receptor. Unlike many other antidepressants, it does not inhibit the reuptake of serotonin, norepinephrine, or dopamine, nor does it inhibit monoamine oxidase. Similarly, mirtazapine has weak or no activity as an anticholinergic or blocker of sodium or calcium channels, in contrast to most tricyclic antidepressants. In accordance, it has better tolerability and low toxicity in overdose. As an H1 receptor antagonist, mirtazapine is extremely potent, and is in fact the most potent of all the tricyclic and tetracyclic antidepressants. Antagonism of the H1 receptor is by far the strongest activity of mirtazapine, with the drug acting as a selective H1 receptor antagonist at low concentrations.

The (S)-(+) enantiomer of mirtazapine is responsible for antagonism of the serotonin 5-HT2A and 5-HT2C receptors, while the (R)-(–) enantiomer is responsible for antagonism of the 5-HT3 receptor. Both enantiomers are involved in antagonism of the H1 and α2-adrenergic receptors, although the (S)-(+) enantiomer is the stronger antihistamine.

Although not clinically relevant, mirtazapine has been found to act as a partial agonist of the κ-opioid receptor at high concentrations (EC50 = 7.2 μM).

α2-Adrenergic receptor
Antagonism of the α2-adrenergic receptors, which function largely as inhibitory autoreceptors and heteroreceptors, enhances adrenergic and serotonergic neurotransmission, notably central 5-HT1A receptor mediated transmission in the dorsal raphe nucleus and hippocampus; hence, mirtazapine's classification as a NaSSA. Indirect α1 adrenoceptor-mediated enhancement of serotonin cell firing and direct blockade of inhibitory α2 heteroreceptors located on serotonin terminals are held responsible for the increase in extracellular serotonin. Because of this, mirtazapine has been said to be a functional "indirect agonist" of the 5-HT1A receptor. Increased activation of the central 5-HT1A receptor is thought to be a major mediator of efficacy of most antidepressant drugs.

5-HT2 receptor
Antagonism of the 5-HT2 subfamily of receptors and inverse agonism of the 5-HT2C receptor appears to be in part responsible for mirtazapine's efficacy in the treatment of depressive states. 
Mirtazapine increases dopamine release in the prefrontal cortex. Accordingly, it was shown that by blocking the α2-adrenergic receptors and 5-HT2C receptors mirtazapine disinhibited dopamine and norepinephrine activity in these areas in rats. In addition, mirtazapine's antagonism of 5-HT2A receptors has beneficial effects on anxiety, sleep and appetite, as well as sexual function regarding the latter receptor. Mirtazapine has been shown to lower drug seeking behaviour (more specifically to methamphetamine) in various human and animal studies. It is also being investigated in substance abuse disorders to reduce withdrawal effects and improve remission rates.

Mirtazapine significantly improves pre-existing symptoms of nausea, vomiting, diarrhea, and irritable bowel syndrome in affected individuals. Mirtazapine may be used as an inexpensive antiemetic alternative to Ondansetron. In conjunction with substance abuse counseling, mirtazapine has been investigated for the purpose of reducing methamphetamine use in dependent individuals with success. In contrast to mirtazapine, the selective serotonin reuptake inhibitors, serotonin–norepinephrine reuptake inhibitors, monoamine oxidase inhibitors, and some tricyclic antidepressants increase the general activity of the 5-HT2A, 5-HT2C, and 5-HT3 receptors leading to a host of negative changes and side effects, the most prominent of which including anorexia, insomnia, nausea, and diarrhea, among others. Its reduced incidence of sexual dysfunction (such as loss of libido and anorgasmia) could be a product of negligible binding to the serotonin transporter (as is generally the cause of sexual dysfunction with most selective serotonin reuptake inhibitors) and antagonism of the 5-HT2A receptors; however, Mirtazapine's high affinity towards and inverse agonism of the 5-HT2C receptors may greatly attenuate those pro-sexual factors (as evidenced by the pro-sexual effects of drugs like m-CPP and Lorcaserin which agonize 5-HT2C receptors in a reasonably selective manner). As a result, it is often combined with these drugs to reduce their side-effect profile and to produce a stronger antidepressant effect.

Mirtazapine does not have pro-serotonergic activity and thus does not cause serotonin syndrome. This is in accordance with the fact that it is not a serotonin reuptake inhibitor or monoamine oxidase inhibitor, nor a serotonin receptor agonist. There are no reports of serotonin syndrome in association with mirtazapine alone, and mirtazapine has not been found to cause serotonin syndrome in overdose. However, there are a handful of case reports of serotonin syndrome occurring with mirtazapine in combination with serotonergic drugs like selective serotonin reuptake inhibitors, although such reports are very rare, and do not necessarily implicate mirtazapine as causative.

5-HT3 receptor
It is a potent 5-HT3 blocker. It may relieve chemotherapy-related and advanced cancer-related nausea.

H1 receptor
Mirtazapine is a very strong H1 receptor inverse agonist and, as a result, it can cause powerful sedative and hypnotic effects. A single 15 mg dose of mirtazapine to healthy volunteers has been found to result in over 80% occupancy of the H1 receptor and to induce intense sleepiness. After a short period of chronic treatment, however, the H1 receptor tends to desensitize and the antihistamine effects become more tolerable. Many patients may also dose at night to avoid the effects, and this appears to be an effective strategy for combating them. Blockade of the H1 receptor may improve pre-existing allergies, pruritus, nausea, and insomnia in affected individuals. It may also contribute to weight gain, however. In contrast to the H1 receptor, mirtazapine has only low affinity for the muscarinic acetylcholine receptors, although anticholinergic side effects like dry mouth, constipation, and mydriasis are still sometimes seen in clinical practice.

Pharmacokinetics
The oral bioavailability of mirtazapine is about 50%. It is found mostly bound to plasma proteins, about 85%. It is metabolized primarily in the liver by N-demethylation and hydroxylation via cytochrome P450 enzymes, CYP1A2, CYP2D6, CYP3A4. The overall elimination half-life is 20–40 hours, and this is independent of dosage. It is conjugated in the kidney for excretion in the urine, where 75% of the drug is excreted, and about 15% is eliminated in feces. Desmethylmirtazapine is an active metabolite of mirtazapine which is believed to contribute about 3-10% to the drugs overall effects and has a half-life of about 25 hours.

Chemistry
Mirtazapine is a tetracyclic piperazinoazepine; mianserin was developed by the same team of organic chemists and mirtazapine differs from it via addition of a nitrogen atom in one of the rings. It is a racemic mixture of enantiomers. The (S)-(+)-enantiomer is known as esmirtazapine.

Analogues of mirtazapine include mianserin, setiptiline, and aptazapine.

Synthesis
A chemical synthesis of mirtazapine has been published. The first step of synthesis is a condensation reaction between the molecule 2-chloro 3-cyanopyridine and the molecule 1-methyl-3-phenylpiperazine.

History
Mirtazapine was first synthesized at Organon and published in 1989, was first approved for use in major depressive disorder in the Netherlands in 1994, and was introduced in the United States in 1996 under the brand name Remeron.

Society and culture

In the Media 
Therapeutic levels of mirtazapine were found in the blood of film director Tony Scott during an autopsy after his suicide in 2012.

Generic names
Its generic name in Spanish, Italian and Portuguese is mirtazapina and in German and Swedish is Mirtazapin.

Brand names
Mirtazapine is marketed under many brand names worldwide, including Adco-Mirteron, Afloyan, Amirel, Arintapin Smelt, Avanza, Axit, Azapin, Beron, Bilanz, Blumirtax, Calixta, Ciblex, Combar, Comenter, Depreram, Divaril, Esprital, Maz, Menelat, Mepirzapine, Merdaten, Meronin, Mi Er Ning, Milivin, Minelza, Minivane, Mirastad, Mirazep, Miro, Miron, Mirrador, Mirt, Mirta, Mirtabene, Mirtadepi, Mirtagamma, Mirtagen, Mirtalan, Mirtamor, Mirtamylan, Mirtan, Mirtaneo, Mirtapax, Mirtapil, Mirtapine, Mirtaron, Mirtastad, Mirtax, Mirtaz, Mirtazap, Mirtazapin, Mirtazapina, Mirtazapine, Mirtazapinum, Mirtazelon, Mirtazon, Mirtazonal, Mirtel, Mirtimash, Mirtin, Mirtine, Mirzapine, Mirzaten, Mirzest, Mitaprex, Mitaxind, Mitocent, Mitrazin, Mizapin, Motofen, Mytra, Norset, Noxibel, Pharmataz, Promyrtil, Rapizapine, Ramure, Razapina, Redepra, Reflex, Remergil, Remergon, Remeron, Remirta, Rexer, Saxib, Sinmaron, Smilon, Tazepin, Tazimed, Tetrazic, Tifona, U-Mirtaron, U-zepine, Valdren, Vastat, Velorin, Yarocen, Zania, Zapex, Zestat, Zismirt, Zispin, Zuleptan, and Zulin.

Research
The use of mirtazapine has been explored in several additional conditions:
 Sleep apnea/hypopnea
 Secondary symptoms of autistic spectrum conditions and other pervasive developmental disorders
 Antipsychotic-induced akathisia. 
 Drug withdrawal, dependence and detoxification
 Negative, depressive and cognitive symptoms of schizophrenia (as an adjunct)
 A case report has been published in which mirtazapine reduced visual hallucinations in a patient with Parkinson's disease psychosis (PDP). This is in alignment with recent findings that inverse agonists at the 5-HT2A receptors are efficacious in attenuating the symptoms of Parkinson's disease psychosis. As is supported by the common practice of prescribing low-dose quetiapine and clozapine for PDP at doses too low to antagonize the D2 receptor, but sufficiently high doses to inversely agonize the 5-HT2A receptors.
 Eight case reports have been reported in five papers on the use of mirtazapine in the treatment of hives as of 2017.

Veterinary use
Mirtazapine also has some veterinary use in cats and dogs. Mirtazapine is sometimes prescribed as an appetite stimulant for cats or dogs experiencing loss of appetite due to medical conditions such as chronic kidney disease. It is especially useful for treating combined poor appetite and nausea in cats and dogs.

Mirtazapine is indicated for bodyweight gain in cats experiencing poor appetite and weight loss resulting from chronic medical conditions.

There are two options for administration: tablets given orally, and an ointment applied topically to the inner surface of the ear.

The most common side effects include signs of local irritation or inflammation at the site where the ointment is applied and behavioural changes (increased meowing, hyperactivity, disoriented state or inability to co-ordinate muscle movements, lack of energy/weakness, attention-seeking, and aggression).

References

External links 
 

Alpha-2 blockers
Antiemetics
Anxiolytics
CYP2D6 inhibitors
Schering-Plough brands
Merck & Co. brands
Appetite stimulants
H1 receptor antagonists
Kappa-opioid receptor agonists
Noradrenergic and specific serotonergic antidepressants
Oneirogens
Piperazines
Pyridines
Sedatives
Serotonin receptor antagonists
Tertiary amines
Tetracyclic antidepressants
Wikipedia medicine articles ready to translate